Old Field at Bray, Berkshire was a noted cricket ground in the late 18th century. It was used as the venue for four first-class matches between 1792 and 1795 in addition to several minor matches.

Bray is near Maidenhead and the ground was the home venue of Maidenhead Cricket Club when it was founded in the second half of the 18th century. It was used for first-class matches by the Berkshire county team which was very strong at that time.

The name of the venue has also been given as "Old Field, Bray" but the designation "Oldfield Bray" is given by Scores and Biographies which also calls the Berkshire team "Oldfield" in one match.

References

1775 establishments in England
Bray, Berkshire
Cricket grounds in Berkshire
Cricket in Berkshire
Defunct cricket grounds in England
Defunct sports venues in Berkshire
English cricket venues in the 18th century
History of Berkshire
Sport in Berkshire
Sports venues completed in 1775
Sports venues in Berkshire